Peronyma is a genus of tephritid  or fruit flies in the family Tephritidae.

Species
Peronyma quadrifasciata (Macquart, 1843)

References

Tephritinae
Tephritidae genera
Diptera of North America